Alfred James "Robbie" Robertson (May 19, 1891 – October 30, 1948) was an American football, basketball, and baseball player, track athlete, coach, and college athletics administrator. He spent most of his coaching career at Bradley University in Peoria, Illinois, where he was the athletic director and head coach in football, basketball, and baseball from 1920 to 1948. Robertson Memorial Field House, the former home basketball venue at Bradley, was named in his honor.

Playing career
A native of South Haven, Minnesota, Robertson lettered in football, basketball, and track at Carleton College. In 1912, he captained the football team and was named All-State quarterback. He played as a forward on Carleton's basketball team and as a third baseman in baseball. Robertson spent the 1913–14 academic year at the University of Minnesota, where he played on the freshman football and basketball squads. He transferred to the University of Montana in 1914, where he lettered in football, basketball, baseball, and track. At Montana, he again played quarterback before graduating in 1916.

Coaching career
Robertson began his coaching career in 1917 at Kentucky Wesleyan College in Owensboro, Kentucky. From January to June 1919, he coached basketball, baseball, and track at Georgetown College in Georgetown, Kentucky. Robertson spent the 1919–20 academic year at Fort Hays Kansas State Normal School—now known as Fort Hays State University—as athletic director and coach of all sports. He led the 1919 Fort Hays football team to a record of 3–6.

Illness and death
Robertson was hospitalized in October 1948 in Peoria, Illinois and had surgery for a "rare liver aliment" at the Mayo Clinic in Rochester, Minnesota later that month. He died on October 30, at the Saint Mary's Hospital in Rochester, at the age of 57.

Head coaching record

Football

References

External links
 

1891 births
1948 deaths
American football quarterbacks
American men's basketball players
Baseball third basemen
Forwards (basketball)
Bradley Braves athletic directors
Bradley Braves baseball coaches
Bradley Braves football coaches
Bradley Braves men's basketball coaches
Carleton Knights baseball players
Carleton Knights football players
Carleton Knights men's basketball players
College men's track and field athletes in the United States
College track and field coaches in the United States
Fort Hays State Tigers athletic directors
Fort Hays State Tigers football coaches
Fort Hays State Tigers men's basketball coaches
Georgetown Tigers baseball coaches
Georgetown Tigers men's basketball coaches
Montana Grizzlies baseball players
Montana Grizzlies football players
Montana Grizzlies basketball players
People from Wright County, Minnesota
Coaches of American football from Minnesota
Players of American football from Minnesota
Baseball coaches from Minnesota
Baseball players from Minnesota
Basketball coaches from Minnesota
Basketball players from Minnesota
Track and field athletes from Minnesota